Anolis brasiliensis, the Brazilian anole, is a species of lizard in the family Dactyloidae. The species is found in Brazil.

References

Anoles
Reptiles of Brazil
Endemic fauna of Brazil
Reptiles described in 1970
Taxa named by Paulo Vanzolini
Taxa named by Ernest Edward Williams